Arjan may refer to:

Places
 Arjan, East Azerbaijan, a village in Iran
 Arjan, Isfahan, a village in Iran
 Arjan District, an administrative subdivision of Iran
 Arrajan, a medieval city and province near modern-day Behbahan
 Arjan Protected Area, Iran

People
 Arjan Bajwa (born 1979), Indian actor
 Arjan Bellaj (born 1971), Albanian footballer
 Arjan Beqaj (born 1975), ethnic Albanian footballer from Kosovo
 Arjan Bhullar (born 1986), Olympic freestyle wrestler for Canada
 Arjan Bimo (born 1959), Albanian football player
 Arjan Breukhoven (born 1962), Dutch musician
 Arjan Brussee (born 1972), Dutch computer game developer
 Arjan Singh Chahal (1839–1908), Sikh Chahal Jat
 Arjan Drayton Chana (born 1994), field hockey player
 Arjan Christianen (born 1982), Dutch professional footballer
 Arjan de Zeeuw (born 1970), Dutch footballer
 Guru Arjan Dev, Sikh guru
 Arjan Ederveen (born 1956), Dutch actor, comedian, scriptwriter, and director
 Arjan El Fassed (born 1973), Dutch politician
 Arjan Erkel (born 1970), Dutch medical aid worker
 Arjan Hasid (1930–2019), Indian Sindhi language poet
 Arjan Human (born 1978), Dutch association football player
 Arjan Jagt (born 1966), retired Dutch cyclist
 Arjan Knipping (born 1994), Dutch swimmer
 Arjan Singh Mastana (died 1986), Punjab politician
 Arjan Moen (born 1977), Dutch darts player
 Arjan Mostafa (born 1994), Iraqi forward
 Arjan Peço (born 1975), Albanian football player and coach
 Arjan Pisha (born 1977), Albanian footballer
 Arjan Roskam, King of Cannabis
 Arjan Schreuder (born 1972), Dutch speed skater
 Arjan Sheta (born 1981), Albanian footballer
 Arjan Kumar Sikri (born 1954), judge of the Supreme Court of India
 Arjan Singh (1919–2017), five-star officer of the Indian Air Force
 Arjan Kripal Singh (born 1969), Indian cricketer
  (born 1978), Dutch speed skater
 Arjan Stafa (born 1964), Albanian football
 Arjan Swinkels (born 1984), Dutch footballer
 Arjan Terpstra, musician
 Arjan van Dijk (born 1987), Dutch footballer
 Arjan van Heusden (born 1972), Dutch footballer
 Arjan Vermeulen (born 1969), Dutch footballer
 Arjan Xhumba (born 1968), Albanian footballer
 Arjan Zaimi (born 1957), Albanian military leader and politician

Dutch masculine given names
Albanian masculine given names